The 1954 Sylvania Television Awards were presented on November 30, 1954, in New York City. The Sylvania Awards were established by Sylvania Electric Products. The awards were selected by a committee of judges that included Ethel Barrymore, Deems Taylor, and James A. Farley.

The committee presented the following awards:
 Grand award - James E. Moser, creator and writer of Medic
 Most outstanding program - Medic, awards to executive producer Worthington Miner and Dow Chemical Co. (NBC)
 Best dramatic series - The Philco Goodyear Television Playhouse, Fred Coe and Gordon Duff, producers (NBC)
 Finest original teleplay - Man or Mountain Top, awards to Robert Alan Aurthur, author, and Arthur Penn, director (NBC)
 Dramatic actor - Steven Hill
 Dramatic actress - Eva Marie Saint
 Character actor - E. G. Marshall 
 Character actress - Eileen Heckart
 Outstanding comedy team - Jackie Gleason, Audrey Meadows, and Art Carney, for their work in the "Honeymooners" sketches on The Jackie Gleason Show (CBS)
 Wholesome family entertainment - Father Knows Best, Robert Young and Jane Wyatt, Screen Gems (CBS)
 Most outstanding series for children of all ages - Disneyland, Walt Disney (ABC)
 Finest local children's show - Little Schoolhouse, Mrs. Eleanor Hempel (KTTV, Los Angeles)
 Best educational series - The Search, Irving Gitlin, producer (CBS)
 Comedian of the year - George Gobel (NBC)
 Documentary program of the year - Three Two One . . . Zero, Henry Salomon Jr., producer and co-writer (NBC)
 Excellent showmanship in variety entertainment - Ed Sullivan and Marlo Lewis, Talk of the Town (CBS)
 Local public service - Our Beautiful Potomac, Stuart Finley, producer and narrator (WRC-TV, Washington, DC)
 Superior camera direction - Franklin Schaffner, director, for Twelve Angry Men (CBS)
 Public information service - John Charles Daly, producer, for Open Hearing (ABC)
 Local television news coverage - Telepix News, John Tillman, newscaster, WPIX, New York City

References

Sylvania Awards